Denglong may refer to:

Paper lantern, lantern made of thin, brightly colored paper
Denglong (mythology), Chinese legendary creature
Denglong Township, Jiangxi, in Ji'an County, Jiangxi, China
Denglong Township, Sichuan, in Baiyu County, Sichuan, China